is a train station on the Minobu Line of Central Japan Railway Company (JR Central) located in the town of Ichikawamisato, Nishiyatsushiro District, Yamanashi Prefecture, Japan.

Lines
Ashigawa Station is served by the Minobu Line and is located 71.7 kilometers from the southern terminus of the line at Fuji Station.

Layout
Ashigawa Station has one side platform serving a single track. The station is not attended.

Adjacent stations

History
Ashigawa Station was opened on February 11, 1929, as a passenger stop on the Fuji-Minobu Line. It was elevated in status to a full station on October 1, 1938. The line came under control of the Japanese Government Railways on May 1, 1941. The station building was reconstructed in 1950. The JGR became the JNR (Japan National Railway) after World War II. The station has been unattended since April 1985. Along with the division and privatization of JNR on April 1, 1987, the station came under the control and operation of the Central Japan Railway Company.

Surrounding area
 Ueno Elementary School
 former Mitama Town Hall

See also
 List of railway stations in Japan

External links

  Minobu Line station information 	

Railway stations in Japan opened in 1929
Railway stations in Yamanashi Prefecture
Minobu Line
Ichikawamisato, Yamanashi